Henri Duvanel (7 March 1896 – 21 February 1953) was a French water polo player. He competed at the 1920 Summer Olympics, but his team was eliminated in the first round. Duvanel was also a swimmer and lieutenant in the French Army.

References

Olympic water polo players of France
Water polo players at the 1920 Summer Olympics
French male water polo players
1896 births
1953 deaths